A metamyelocyte is a cell undergoing granulopoiesis, derived from a myelocyte, and leading to a band cell.

It is characterized by the appearance of a bent nucleus, cytoplasmic granules, and the absence of visible nucleoli. (If the nucleus is not yet bent, then it is likely a myelocyte.)

Additional images

See also
 Pluripotential hemopoietic stem cell

External links
  - "Bone Marrow and Hemopoiesis: bone marrow smear, neutrophilic metamyelocyte and mature PMN"
 
 
 
 Interactive diagram at lycos.es
 Slide at marist.edu
 hematologyatlas.com

Histology
Leukocytes